The men's 100m butterfly events at the 2022 World Para Swimming Championships were held at the Penteada Olympic Swimming Complex in Madeira between 12–18 June.

Medalists

Results

S8

S9

S10

S11

S12

S13
Heats
11 swimmers from eight nations took part. The swimmers with the top eight times, regardless of heat, advanced to the final.

Final
The final was held on 12 June 2022.

References

2022 World Para Swimming Championships